Ariston of Smyrna (Latin: Aristo Smyrnaeus), also known as Ariston the Elder, was an Early Christian, Bishop of Smyrna (modern İzmir, Turkey), who allegedly was an eyewitness and disciple of Jesus of Nazareth and a companion of John the Elder.

Personal Information 
Ariston, or Aristion, is known from early traditions (preserved by Papias of Hierapolis) as an elder from whom Papias learned apostolic traditions. Aristion is identified in Ado of Vienne (874 CE) as "one of the seventy-two disciples of Christ." 
Very little details are know about his life,

Papias, then, inquired of travelers passing through Hierapolis what the surviving disciples of Jesus and the elders—those who had personally known the Twelve Apostles—were saying. One of these disciples was Aristion, and another was John the Elder, usually identified (despite Eusebius' protest) with John the Evangelist, residing in nearby Ephesus, of whom Papias was a hearer; Papias frequently cited both. From the daughters of Philip, who settled in Hierapolis, Papias learned still other traditions. This close association with John could mean that Ariston too was young during Jesus's ministry.

However his name is not mentioned in any later tradition of the Seventy disciples.

Relation to the Gospel of Mark 

One Armenian manuscript, Matenadaran 2374 (formerly known as Etchmiadsin 229), made in 989, features a note, written between Mark 16:8 and 16:9, Ariston eritzou, that is, "By Ariston the Elder/Priest". Implying that the authorship of the long ending of Mark would be traditionally attributed to this first century Bishop. This would explain why Church Fathers like Irenaeus of Lyon already received the longer ending as canonical part of the Gospel. Others contest this association and claim that this could well refer Ariston of Pella another unknown Ariston instead.

References 

Church Fathers
People from İzmir
1st-century bishops in Roman Anatolia
Ancient Smyrnaeans
1st-century Romans
Eastern Orthodox bishops of Smyrna